Back to Ballin is the second album by the southern rapper Lil' Troy, released in 2001.

The album peaked at No. 95 on the Billboard 200.

Critical reception
The Village Voice wrote that Lil' Troy's "squeaky voice [is] multi-multi-tracked to sound like at least a half a dozen small woodland creatures cold representin.'"

Track listing
 "Pimp Is Back" :39
 "For Years" (featuring D-Man & R-Dis) 3:48
 "Mo Money, Mo Problems" 4:50
 "Pop Ya Collar" 3:58
 "We Gon Lean" (featuring Lil' Flip & R-Dis) 4:23
 "Back to Ballin" (featuring T-2) 3:45
 "There He Go" 3:43
 "Lesbian Nights" 4:10
 "Long Time" 3:30
 "Let's Smoke" 4:19
 "Buckle" 3:40
 "Wired Up" 3:58
 "Touch Ya Toes" 3:29
 "Keep My Name Out Your Mouth" 3:49
 "Dead Wrong" 1:01
 "We Gon Lean" (Remix by Dirk) 4:06
 " Steady Shinin'" 5:22
 " Baby Girl Wanna Ride On Me" 3:21
 "Wanna Be a Baller" (Chopped & Screwed Version) 7:57

References 

2001 albums
Lil' Troy albums
E1 Music albums